Roberto Ferrari may refer to:

 Roberto Ferrari (athlete) (born 1967), retired Italian high jumper
 Roberto Ferrari (cardiologist) (born 1950), Italian cardiologist
 Roberto Ferrari (cyclist) (born 1983), Italian cyclist
 Roberto Ferrari (fencer) (1923–1996), Italian Olympic fencer
 Roberto Ferrari (gymnast) (1890–1954), Italian gymnast